"He's Unbelievable" is a song by German singer-songwriter Sarah Connor from her second studio album, Unbelievable (2002). Written and produced by Rob Tyger and Kay Denar, it was released as the album's third single on 24 March 2003. The track contains elements of 2Pac's 1996 hit "California Love" featuring Dr. Dre.

Track listings
German CD single
 "He's Unbelievable" (Kayrob Video Mix) – 3:26
 "Please Take Him Back" – 3:43

German CD maxi single
 "He's Unbelievable" (Kayrob Video Mix) – 3:26
 "He's Unbelievable" (Kayrob Radio Rmx) – 3:52
 "He's Unbelievable" (UK Radio Edit) – 3:26
 "Please Take Him Back" – 3:43
 "He's Unbelievable" (Detroit Club Mix featuring Strawberry) – 4:04
 "He's Unbelievable" (Ced Solo Club Remix featuring Strawberry) – 4:13
 "He's Unbelievable" (Video - German Version) – 3:26

European CD single
 "He's Unbelievable" (Radio Edit) – 3:26
 "He's Unbelievable" (Album Rmx Version) – 3:54

European CD maxi single
 "He's Unbelievable" (UK Radio Edit) – 3:26
 "He's Unbelievable" (Kayrob Radio Rmx) – 3:52
 "He's Unbelievable" (Album Version) – 4:20
 "He's Unbelievable" (Detroit Club Mix) – 4:03
 "He's Unbelievable" (Ced Solo Club Mix featuring Strawberry) – 4:13
 "He's Unbelievable" (Ced Solo NYC Street Mix featuring Strawberry) – 4:02
 "He's Unbelievable" (Video - UK Version) – 3:26

UK CD single
 "He's Unbelievable" (Radio Edit) – 3:26
 "He's Unbelievable" (Ced Solo Club Mix featuring Strawberry) – 4:13
 "He's Unbelievable" (Ced Solo NYC Street Mix featuring Strawberry) – 4:02
 "He's Unbelievable" (D-Bop Mix/Radio Edit) – 3:41
 "He's Unbelievable" (Video - UK Version) – 3:26

UK cassette single
 "He's Unbelievable" (UK Radio Edit)
 "He's Unbelievable" (Ced Solo Club Remix featuring Strawberry)

Australian CD single
 "He's Unbelievable" (Kayrob Radio Rmx) – 3:52
 "He's Unbelievable" – 4:19
 "He's Unbelievable" (Detroit Club Mix) – 4:03
 "He's Unbelievable" (Ced Solo NYC Street featuring Strawberry the Preachers Daughter - Main Mix) – 4:00

Charts

Weekly charts

Year-end charts

Release history

References

2002 songs
2003 singles
Epic Records singles
Sarah Connor (singer) songs
Songs written by Kay Denar
Songs written by Rob Tyger
X-Cell Records singles